Midway is an unincorporated community in Cincinnati Township, Tazewell County, Illinois, United States.

References

Unincorporated communities in Tazewell County, Illinois
Unincorporated communities in Illinois